Štefurov is a village and municipality in Svidník District in the Prešov Region of north-eastern Slovakia. The village has a population of 117 according to the 2011 census.

History
In historical records the village was first mentioned in 1414.

Geography
The municipality lies at an altitude of 243 meters and covers an area of 8,753 km². It has a population of about 113 people.

Notable person
 Jack Quinn, Slovak-American professional baseball player who pitched until age 50

References

External links
 
 

Villages and municipalities in Svidník District
Šariš